The Copernican Revolution is the scientific paradigm shift from the Earth-centric model of the universe to the heliocentric model of the Solar System. 

It may also refer to:

 The Copernican Revolution (book), 1957 book by philosopher Thomas Kuhn
 The Copernican Revolution (poetry), 1946 poetry by Paul Goodman